Anthony V. Gazzara (born July 11, 1937) is an American lawyer and politician from New York.

Life
Gazzara was born on July 11, 1937, in Astoria, Queens, New York City. He attended Public School no. 4, and Long Island City High School. He graduated from the City University of New York and Brooklyn Law School. He was admitted to the bar in 1962, practiced law in New York City, and entered politics as a Democrat. He married Marilyn, and they had two children.

On February 14, 1974, he was elected to the New York State Assembly, to fill the  vacancy caused by the election of Joseph S. Calabretta to the New York City Civil Court. He was re-elected in November 1974, and sat in the 180th and 181st New York State Legislatures.

On March 2, 1976, Gazzara was elected to the New York State Senate, to fill the vacancy caused by the death of John J. Moore. He was re-elected four times, and remained in the Senate until 1983, sitting in the 181st, 182nd, 183rd, 184th and 185th New York State Legislatures. He resigned his seat on May 23, 1983, and was appointed as Chairman of the New York State Liquor Authority.

He resigned the post on the Liquor Authority on February 28, 1985, to get a job as a Vice President in the administration of the Jacob K. Javits Convention Center.

He was a judge of the New York City Civil Court from 1994 to 2003.

References

1937 births
Living people
People from Astoria, Queens
Democratic Party New York (state) state senators
Democratic Party members of the New York State Assembly
City University of New York alumni
Brooklyn Law School alumni